Amata tenera is a moth of the family Erebidae. It was described by Gustaaf Hulstaert in 1923. It is found in the Democratic Republic of the Congo.

References

 

tenera
Moths described in 1923
Moths of Africa